Rhodesia was an unrecognised state in southern Africa from 1965 to 1979, equivalent in territory to modern Zimbabwe. This article lists number-one singles on Rhodesia's music chart, the Lyons Maid Hits Of The Week, broadcast by Radio 1. Its rankings were based on weekly sales. In the late 1960s and early 1970s the chart included both singles and LPs, but later only singles were included.

1965 
Rhodesia declared independence on 11 November 1965. Previously, it was the British colony of Southern Rhodesia.

1966

1967

1968

1969

1970

1971

1972

1973

1974

1975

1976

1977

1978

1979 
Rhodesia was succeeded by Zimbabwe Rhodesia on 1 June 1979, which existed until 12 December 1979, when it reverted to temporary British colonial rule as Southern Rhodesia. The modern Republic of Zimbabwe gained independence on 18 April 1980.

See also 

 Music of Zimbabwe

Notes and references 
FootnotesReferences

Rhodesia
Rhodesia
list of number-one singles
list of number-one singles in Rhodesia
Rhodesia